, or Tôkyô Joshi Zukan, is a Japanese television drama series that aired in 2016–2017, written by Hisako Kurosawa and directed by Yuki Tanada.  The show was streamed on Amazon Prime starting in 2018.

Premise
The show follows the life of a woman named Aya, originally from the town of Akita, Japan. The 11 episodes span her life from about the age 18 to age 45.  Each episode shows a snapshot of her life, and the episodes are spaced every few years.  The title of each episode is the name of the neighborhood in Tokyo where she is living at that point in her life.

Cast
 Asami Mizukawa as Aya
 Tsuyoshi Abe	
 Masako Chiba
 Shiina Hanasaka	
 Hana Hizuki
 Shôhei Ueki

External links
 
2016 in Japanese television
2016 Japanese television series debuts
Japanese drama television series
Works by Yuki Tanada